Sorell may refer to:

People 
 Traci Sorell, Cherokee American writer
 William Sorell (1775–1848), Lieutenant-Governor of Tasmania

Places 
 Sorell, Tasmania north east of Hobart
 Sorell Council, a local government area in Tasmania that contains the town of Sorell, Tasmania
 Sorell Creek, Tasmania, a locality in the Derwent Valley Council area
 Cape Sorell, Tasmania on the west coast of Tasmania
 Port Sorell, Tasmania on the north coast
 Lake Sorell, Tasmania, a locality (and a lake) in Tasmania

See also
Sorel (disambiguation)
Sorrel (disambiguation)
Sorrell (disambiguation)